Julius Juhn (born 19 December 1921) was an Austrian ice hockey player. He competed in the men's tournament at the 1948 Winter Olympics.

References

External links
 

1921 births
Possibly living people
Austrian ice hockey players
Olympic ice hockey players of Austria
Ice hockey players at the 1948 Winter Olympics
Ice hockey people from Vienna
20th-century Austrian people